Aziza Mustafa Zadeh (born December 19, 1969) is an Azerbaijani singer, pianist, and composer who plays a fusion of jazz and mugham (a traditional improvisational style of Azerbaijan) with classical and avant-garde influences.

Biography
Aziza was born in Baku to musical parents Vagif and Elza Mustafa Zadeh (née Bandzeladze).

Aziza's parents first noticed their daughter's sensitivity to music when she was eight months old. Aziza recalls the story as her mother tells it: 

Aziza enjoyed all forms of art, especially dancing, painting and singing. At the age of three, she made her stage debut with her father, improvising vocals. She began studying classical piano at an early age, showing special interest in the works of famous composers Johann Sebastian Bach and Frédéric Chopin. Soon thereafter, she showed a growing talent for improvisation.

On December 16, 1979, Aziza's father died of a severe heart attack in Tashkent at the age of 39. In order to help her daughter cope with this blow, Aziza's mother gave up her career as a singer to help nurture her daughter's own musical talents.

In 1988, at the age of 18, Aziza's mugam-influenced style helped her win third place together with American Matt Cooper in the Herbie Hancock Institute of Jazz (formerly Thelonious Monk Institute of Jazz) piano competition in Washington, D.C. It was around this time that she moved to Germany with her mother.

Aziza released her debut album, Aziza Mustafa Zadeh, in 1991. The album showed influence of Chick Corea and  Keith Jarrett, as well as Near Eastern music. Her second album, Always, won her the Phono Academy Prize, a prestigious German music award, and the Echo Prize from Sony. She has since performed in many countries with many jazz and traditional luminaries and released several more albums, the most recent being Generations, released in 2020.

Aziza currently resides in Mainz, Germany, with her mother, Elza Mustafa Zadeh, who is also her manager. Her two favorite leisure activities, she says, are painting and sleeping. She is a vegetarian. She believes in God, though she does not consider herself as belonging to any religion.

Baku Jazz Festival 2007
Aziza visited Azerbaijan in June 2007 for the Baku Jazz Festival, starring in her own concert at the Azerbaijan State Academic Opera and Ballet Theater and headlining the end-of-festival concert at the open-air Green Theater.

Discography

 Aziza Mustafa Zadeh (1991)
 Always (1993)
 Dance of Fire (1995)
 Seventh Truth (1996)
 Jazziza (1997)
 Inspiration – Colors & Reflections (2000)
 Shamans (2002)
 Contrasts (2006)
 Contrasts II (2007)
 Generations (2020)

References

External links

 
 Azerbaijan International article
 AllAboutJazz.com: Aziza Mustafa Zadeh: Body and Soul and Mugam!
 Listen to Aziza Mustafa Zadeh, Music Section of Azerbaijan International

1969 births
Azerbaijani jazz singers
Azerbaijani women pianists
Azerbaijani jazz pianists
20th-century Azerbaijani women singers
Musicians from Baku
Azerbaijani deists
Living people
Scat singers
Women jazz pianists
Azerbaijani people of Georgian descent
21st-century pianists
21st-century Azerbaijani women singers
20th-century women pianists
21st-century women pianists